Ahmed Saeed Awan  is a Pakistani politician who served as member of the National Assembly of Pakistan. He became a judge of Lahore High Court in 1994.

References

Year of birth missing
2015 deaths
Pakistani MNAs 1988–1990
Pakistani judges
Pakistan People's Party politicians
Judges of the Lahore High Court